Drew Sherman is a Welsh professional football manager who is the technical director of Melbourne Victory. He was previously the technical director of the Brisbane Roar,  in addition to being the Cook Islands National Team's most successful manager.

Managerial career
Sherman previously coached at Southampton where he worked within the successful academy programme. In 2011, he became the youngest academy manager in the Football League taking the reins of Aldershot Town's Academy. He has also been Academy Manager at Crawley Town.

Sherman holds the UEFA Pro & A Licences, passing his A Licence at the age of 21 through the Football Association of Wales in 2009. He is the son of (Australian) technical director Rob Sherman.

In March 2015, Sherman was appointed as manager, and technical director, of the Cook Islands National Team. During his tenure with the Cook Islands, Sherman led the national team to their highest FIFA Ranking position following the nation's first competitive victories.

In January 2017, Sherman was appointed as technical director of Brisbane Roar's newly formed academy. Between March and May 2017 he was placed as interim assistant manager to John Aloisi following the suspension of Ross Aloisi.

On 25 May 2019, Sherman was appointed by Melbourne Victory as General Manager – Technical & Academy; in this role, he will be charged with overseeing the Victory's talent development pathway and youth teams, including the structure and ongoing rollout of the club's Academy.

Managerial statistics

Honours
Brisbane Roar
National Youth League: 2018–19

References

External links
 Profile at Soccerway
  Website
 Drew Sherman Interview
 From Aldershot to the South Pacific 
 Tiny Cook Islands aim big under inspiring guidance

Living people
1987 births
Welsh footballers
Footballers from Cardiff
Welsh football managers
Cwmbrân Town A.F.C. players
Cook Islands national football team managers
Welsh expatriate football managers
Welsh expatriate sportspeople in Cook Islands
Expatriate football managers in Cook Islands
Association footballers not categorized by position